Phattharaphon Kangsopa (born May 25, 1996) is a Thai professional footballer who plays as a defender  for Thai League 2 club Lampang.

References

External links
 

1996 births
Living people
Phattharaphon Kangsopa
Association football defenders
Phattharaphon Kangsopa
Phattharaphon Kangsopa
Phattharaphon Kangsopa